Halid 08 is the sixteenth album of Bosnian singer Halid Bešlić. It was released in 2007.

Track listing
Miljacka
Čardak
Ljut na tebe (Angry at You)
Ne traži me (Do Not Look for Me, featuring Fabrizio)
Snježana
Dvadesete (Twenties)
Budna si (You're Awake)
Nije ljubav vino (Love is Not Wine)
Ljubičica (Violet)
Ulica uzdaha (Street of Sighs, featuring Luna)

References

Halid Bešlić albums
2007 albums
Hayat Production albums